Chilocorus nigritus (formerly known as Chilocorus nigrita), sometimes referred to as the Malaysian ladybird beetle, is a species of lady beetle in the family Coccinellidae. It is native to SE Asia, but has been introduced for use in biological pest control in Hawaii and any parts of the world, including Europe.

Distribution
It is found in Agalega, American Samoa, Benin, Bermuda, Brazil, Eswatini, Ghana, Guam, Hawaii, India, Indonesia, Israel, Italy, Kenya, Madagascar, Malaysia, Marshall Islands, Mauritius, Mozambique, Myanmar, Nepal, New Caledonia, Oman, Pakistan, Reunion Island, Seychelles, Society Islands, Solomon Islands, South Africa, Sri Lanka, Tanzania, Togo, Turkey, Uganda, United States, Vanuatu and Zimbabwe.

Description

Very similar to Chilocorus subindicus in morphology. Body length is about 3.2 to 4.0 mm. Body sub circular. Elytra, pronotum and outer margins of elytral epipleura are very dark pitchy black in color. Head, lateral parts of pronotum, legs and vertrum yellowish brown. Lateral margins of elytra are much paler than disc. Vertex of head and lateral sides of pronotum are darker brown to black in many females. Head clothed with fine pubescence. Head variably punctured from fine to moderately coarse. Interstices ranges from flat to convex. Pronotum finely punctured with flat interstices which become shiny on disc. Elytra shiny, and without microsculpture. Elytra finely punctured, where the punctures are separated by 3 to 6 diameters on disc. In male genitalia, median lobe with broad basal half which is abruptly contracted at base and bulging sub-basally. Apex of median lobe turned ventrally in lateral sides. Parameres are blade-shaped and abruptly angled.

Biology
It is one of the major predators on diaspid scale insects such as Aonidiella aurantii, Abgrallaspis cyanophylli, Aleurotrachelus atratus, Aonidiella citrina, Aspidiotus rigidus, Chrysomphalus aonidum, Lepidosaphes gloverii, Parasaissetia nigra, Parlatoria blanchardi, Saccharicoccus sacchari, Aonidiella orientalis, Aspidiotus destructor, Hemiberiesia latanias, Leucaspis coniferarum, Pinnaspis strachani, Quadraspidiotus perniciosus, Tecaspis.

References

Coccinellidae
Beetles described in 1798